The Dumping Ground Dish Up is a five-part CBBC miniseries featuring various previous Dumping Ground characters showing you how to cook different dishes, which aired online and on TV from 16–20 November 2015.

Cast

Episodes

References

External links
 
The Dumping Ground Dish Up at BBC 

2010s British children's television series
2015 British television series debuts
2015 British television series endings
BBC children's television shows
The Story of Tracy Beaker
The Dumping Ground
Tracy Beaker series
Television series by BBC Studios